Brendan Kelly (born September 8, 1976) is the bassist/vocalist of Chicago-based punk band The Lawrence Arms, as well as guitarist/lead vocalist in The Falcon and Brendan Kelly and the Wandering Birds.  Kelly's former bands include Slapstick and The Broadways.  He is known for his raspy vocals, drunken demeanor, and onstage witticisms.

Kelly appeared on The Daily Show in a correspondent piece by Ed Helms entitled "The Clash" in which he criticized Michale Graves for being a Republican.

Early life and education
He attended Northwestern University in Evanston, Illinois, and graduated in 2000 with a Bachelor's Degree in Radio, Television, and Film.

Career
Kelly boycotts the Warped Tour on the belief that it ruins the original system for underground bands of touring and supporting larger bands, as well as ruining business for small venues. He along with The Lawrence Arms were banned for life for spreading this belief to the audience whilst participating in the Warped Tour.

Kelly provided backup vocals for the songs "The Company," "Stuck in Summertime," and "Unsatisfied" on The Copyrights' third full-length album, 2007's Make Sound, released on Red Scare Industries, a label owned and operated by Tobias Jeg, a close friend of Kelly.
Kelly (along with Chris McCaughan, co-vocalist of The Lawrence Arms) also provided back-up vocals on Common Rider's This is Unity Music album.

In 2010, Kelly released a split album with Joe McMahon of punk rock band Smoke or Fire, entitled Wasted Potential. Kelly's half of the split contained acoustic versions of Lawrence Arms songs (both his and McCaughan), as well as a cover of "Kiss the Bottle" by Jawbreaker.

In 2011, Kelly released a three-song EP, A Man with the Passion of Tennessee Williams, with new band the Wandering Birds. A full length, I'd Rather Die Than Live Forever, followed in 2012. The Wandering Birds are generally darker in tone than Kelly's earlier musical output. He also created a short film, The Spirit of Transparency, to promote the project.

During the periods of inactivity of his musical projects, Brendan has been joined by fellow punk rock singers Laura Jane Grace and Brian Fallon in maintaining a blog, Bad Sandwich Chronicles. The blog is a mixture of scatological humor, social commentary, and stories of life in music. Kelly also co-hosts iconic music television program JBTV in Chicago.

Kelly also provided guest vocals on the Alkaline Trio song "I Wanna Be A Warhol" on their 2013 release My Shame Is True.

Kelly is also now part of Punk Rock Weddings  which is the Brainchild of Mike Park founder of Asian Man Records

Nihilist Arby's 
In 2015, Kelly started a Twitter account, Nihilist Arby's, which garnered a huge following with its "absurdist, death-and-doom tweeting" about Arby's and life in general.

Discography

Slapstick
Albums
Lookit! (Dill Records, 1995)
Slapstick (AKA: 25 Songs / Discography) (Asian Man Records, 1997)
Other Releases
Slapstick / Tommyrot (Split, Banter Records, 1993)
Superhero (7-inch EP, Self-Released, 1995)
Crooked (7-inch EP, Dyslexic Records, 1995)

The Broadways
Albums
 Broken Star (Asian Man Records, 1998)
 Broken Van (Asian Man Records, 2000)
Other Releases
 We All Know That You Can Do It (7-inch EP, Bicycle Records, 1997)
 Big City Life (7-inch EP, Asian Man Records, 1998)
 Where's the Beef? (Drive Thru Records, 1997)

The Lawrence Arms
Albums
A Guided Tour of Chicago (Asian Man Records, 1999)
Ghost Stories (Asian Man Records, 2000)
Apathy and Exhaustion (Fat Wreck Chords, 2002)
The Greatest Story Ever Told (Fat Wreck Chords, 2003)
Oh! Calcutta! (Fat Wreck Chords, 2006)
Metropole (Epitaph Records, 2014)
Skeleton Coast (Epitaph Records, 2020)
Other Releases
Shady View Terrace / The Lawrence Arms (Split, Asian Man Records, 2000)
Present Day Memories (Split w/ The Chinkees, Asian Man Records, 2000)
Fat Club (7-inch EP, Fat Wreck Chords, 2001)
Cocktails & Dreams (Compilation, Asian Man Records, 2005)
Buttsweat and Tears (7-inch EP, Fat Wreck Chords, 2009)
News From Yalta (7-inch EP, Epitaph Records, 2014)
We Are the Champions of the World (Compilation, Fat Wreck Chords, 2018)

The Falcon
Albums
Unicornography (Red Scare Industries, 2006)
Gather Up the Chaps (Red Scare Industries, 2016)
Other Releases
God Don't Make No Trash or Up Your Ass with Broken Glass (Red Scare Industries, 2004)

Solo
Other Releases
Wasted Potential (Split w/ Joe McMahon, Anchorless Records, 2010)

Brendan Kelly and the Wandering Birds
Albums
I'd Rather Die Than Live Forever (Red Scare Industries, 2012)
Keep Walkin' Pal (Red Scare Industries, 2018)
Other Releases
European Vacation (Split w/ Dan Andriano in the Emergency Room, Red Scare Industries, 2012)

See also 
 The Lawrence Arms
 The Falcon

References

External links
 Interview with Brendan Kelly
 The Lawrence Arms unofficial website
 Lawrence Arms profile on Punknews.org
 Brendan Kelly and the Wandering Birds profile on Punknews.org

1976 births
Living people
American rock bass guitarists
American punk rock singers
Singers from Chicago
Northwestern University School of Communication alumni
Guitarists from Chicago
American male bass guitarists
21st-century American singers
21st-century American bass guitarists
21st-century American male singers
The Lawrence Arms members
The Falcon (band) members
The Broadways members